The Mansure Army ("The Victorious Soldiers of Muhammad") was an ocak (military unit) of the Ottoman army. It was established by  who also disbanded the Janissary Corps.

After The Auspicious Incident and the disbandment of the Janissary Corps, Mahmud II established a new military  and Agha Hussein Pasha was appointed to the command of the corps. Koca Hüsrev Mehmed Pasha served as their .

Mahmud II was not the first sultan who started the modernisation of the Ottoman army. Despite this, the Mansure Army became the main army corps of the Ottoman Empire until the Dissolution era. In 1912, the uniforms of the ocak were changed and finally in 1918, the Ottoman army was dissolved.

Background 

Before their abolition in 1826, the Janissary corps fiercely opposed attempts by the Sultan and the government to reform the military. This tension between the Janissaries and the state often resulted in violence. In Edirne incident of 1806, the government dispatched a small army to Edirne in order to establish the first headquarters of the New Order Troops in Tekfurdagi in European Turkey. This action provoked the Janissaries, local notables, and conservatives into rallying local troops against the New Order Troops, forcing the government’s soldiers to retreat back to Istanbul. This was followed by a rebellion in 1807, where the Janissaries marched into the capital. They demanded that Selim III abolish the New Order and then forced the Sultan to abdicate, installing the more conservative-minded Mustafa IV as Sultan and effectively ending that period of reform.

The reactionaries only held power for a short time before a rebellion led by a powerful notable Albanian Alemdar Mustafa Pasha, seized control of the capital in July 1808. Alemdar Mustafa and his forces deposed Mustafa IV, executed many Janissaries, banished anti-reform leaders, and installed Mahmud II as the new sultan. Mahmud II made Alemdar Mustafa his Grand Vizier. Together they restarted the reform movement. Alemdar Mustafa oversaw the reformation of the new army, placed new regulations on the Janissaries, and sought to strengthen ties between the center and the periphery of the empire by requesting that notables obey the central government.

The Janissaries resistance, however, remained fierce. In November 1808, they revolted again. The Janissaries killed Alemdar Mustafa, lynched reformist leaders, and forced Mahmud II to abolish the new army.

Janissary resistance to reform finally came to an end following the Auspicious Incident in 1826 when Mahmud II obtained a fatwa sanctioning the slaughter of the Janissaries and the abolition of the corps. The destruction of the Janissary corps opened the door to a new period of Ottoman military reform. The state began recruitment for a new European-style army, the Asakir-i Mansure-i Muhammediye (Victorious Troops of Muhammad). The state also began centralization of the military. In 1834, the state established reserve armies in the Anatolian and Rumelian provinces. In 1838, the government created a Military Council to oversee all of the empire’s military activity. Finally, they disbanded provincial armies, making the new army the only military organization in the empire.

Reform 
The state planned to create an army based upon discipline and drill. The Ottomans invited many skilled officers from Europe to train recruits in European drill and maneuvers. In addition to infantry training, the new army developed regular cavalry squadrons which adopted the methods of Hungarian Hussars. Eventually the government devoted institutions to the study of military science and tactics. The Military School for Officers was inaugurated in 1836 and an artillery school opened soon after in 1837. In addition, the Ottomans sent cadets abroad to study at military institutions in Paris, London, Vienna, and Berlin.

References 

1826 establishments in the Ottoman Empire
Military units and formations of the Ottoman Empire
Military units and formations established in 1826